Évreux-Normandie (until recently: Évreux Embranchement) is the train station for the town of Évreux, Eure, France. It was built by CF de l'Ouest in 1887 (the line opened in 1855).

The station was named Embranchement as it stands at the junction of the lines to Paris and to Rouen. The line to Rouen is now closed but a disused freight line to the northern suburbs of Évreux remains. The station building was heavily bombed during World War II but rebuilt identically to the original building afterwards.

Évreux-Normandie is on the main line from Paris to Cherbourg (Mantes-la-Jolie–Cherbourg railway) and is the main stop for regional double-decker trains (TER Normandie) from Paris to Serquigny.

See also
Évreux-Nord station

References

External links
 

Railway stations in Eure
Évreux
Railway stations in France opened in 1855